Wonderfulness (1966) is the fourth album of stand-up comedy performances by Bill Cosby. The title comes from a catchphrase used in Cosby's television series, I Spy.

This was the first of several Cosby albums to be recorded live at Harrah's, Lake Tahoe, Nevada, by Warner Bros. Records. Seven of the eight tracks are drawn from Cosby's childhood experiences; the last one, "Niagara Falls", deals with a visit to that landmark by television producer Sheldon Leonard, who hired Cosby to star in I Spy.

The version of "Shop" from this album differs from the track of the same title on Cosby's previous album, Why Is There Air?. Wonderfulness won the 1967 Grammy Award for Best Comedy Album.

Track listing

Side one
Tonsils – 15:19
The Playground – 3:21
Lumps – 1:39
Go Carts – 5:40

Side two
Chicken Heart – 12:28
Shop – 2:33
Special Class – 1:34
Niagara Falls – 4:52

References

Bill Cosby live albums
Stand-up comedy albums
Spoken word albums by American artists
Live spoken word albums
1966 live albums
Warner Records live albums
Grammy Award for Best Comedy Album
1960s comedy albums
1960s spoken word albums